Harold William Joseph "Twinkle" Starr (July 6, 1903 — September 25, 1981) was a Canadian professional ice hockey player who played 206 games in the National Hockey League with the Ottawa Senators, Montreal Maroons, Montreal Canadiens, Detroit Red Wings, and New York Rangers between 1929 and 1936.

Career statistics

Regular season and playoffs

External links
 

1903 births
1981 deaths
Canadian ice hockey defencemen
Cleveland Falcons players
Detroit Red Wings players
Ice hockey people from Ottawa
London Panthers players
Montreal Canadiens players
Montreal Maroons players
New York Rangers players
Ottawa Senators (1917) players
Ottawa Senators (QSHL) players
Windsor Bulldogs (1929–1936) players